The European Music Council (EMC) is a regional group of the International Music Council (IMC) representing Europe. It was established in 1972 as the 'European regional group of the IMC' and was renamed the European Music Council in 1992. The IMC was founded by UNESCO in 1949, and is, today, a non-governmental organisation (NGO), which still retains formal relations with UNESCO. Until 2000 the secretariat was based in Aarau, Switzerland, and is now in Bonn, Germany.

The EMC functions as a non-governmental advisory body on musical matters. The membership includes National Music Councils from 15 European countries (including countries outside the European Union such as Azerbaijan, Israel, Russia, and Switzerland); 17 European music organisations; 17 international music organisations and 25 national music organisations or organisations that specialise in specific areas of music.

Members
As of August 2021, The European Music Council has 74 members based in 28 countries.

National Music Councils
National music councils represented are Austria, Azerbaijan, Czech Republic, Estonia, Finland, Germany, Hungary, Israel, Italy, Latvia, Norway, Poland, Russia, Switzerland, and Ukraine.

International Music Organisations
The EMC has 17 members that carry out work on an international level (defined as an organisation that has members or carries out activities in a minimum of ten countries outside of Europe).

 European Festivals Association (EFA)
 Fondazione Adkins Chiti: Donne in Musica
 International Association of Music Information Centres (IAMIC)
 International Association of Music Libraries, Archives and Documentation Centres (IAML)
 International Association of Schools of Jazz (IASJ)
 International Confederation of Accordionists (ICA)
 International Confederation of Electroacoustic Music (ICEM)
 International Federation for Choral Music (IFCM)
 International Federation of Chopin Societies (IFCS)
 International Federation of Musicians (FIM)
 International Music and Media Centre (IMZ)
 International Music Products Association, NAMM
 International Society for Contemporary Music (ISCM)
 International Society for Music Education
 Jeunesses Musicales International (JMI)
 World Federation of Amateur Orchestras (WFAO)
 World Federation of International Music Competitions (WFIMC)

European Music Organisations
There are 18 organisations in the 'European Music Organisations' category of the EMC (defined as operating in a minimum of 20% of Europe).

 Europe Jazz Network (EJN)
 European Association for Music in Schools (EAS)
 European Association of Conservatoires (AEC)
 European Broadcasting Union (EBU)
 European Chamber Music Teachers Association (ECMTA)
 European Choral Association-Europa Cantat (ECA)
 European Composer and Songwriter Alliance (ECSA)
 European Concert Hall Organisation (ECHO)
 European Early Music Network (REMA)
 European Federation of National Youth Orchestras (EFNYO)
 European Music School Union (EMU)
 European Orchestra Federation (EOFed)
 European String Teachers Association
 European Union of Music Competitions for Youth
 European Voice Teachers Association e.v. (EVTA)
 Live DMA - European Network for Music Venues and festivals
 Tenso Network Europe
 European Folk Network (EFN)
 SIMM research platform

National and Specialised Organisations
There are 23 National and Specialised Organisations in the European Music Council's membership (defined as any legal constituted organisation, association, society, company, foundation, corporation or NGO working in the field of arts and culture, which does not fulfil the requirements of an international or regional musical organisation or National Music Council)

 Associazione Emiliano Romagnola Cori (AERCO)
 Association Nationale Cultures et Traditions
 BOZAR - Center for Fine Arts
 Bulgarian Music Association
 CHROMA/Zebrock
 Cyprus Symphony Orchestra Foundation
 Federació Catalana d'Entitats Corals
 Federació Catalana De Societats Musicals
 Flemish Music Council
 Hispania Música Foundation
 L'Alliance Musicale Luxebourg
 Live Music Now! Scotland
 Miso Music Portugal
 Moviment Coral Català
 Music Austria
 Music Council of the French Community of Belgium
 Plate-forme interrégionale
 SafeMUSE - Safe Music Havens Initiative
 Society of Music Merchants (SOMM)
 Scottish Music Centre
 Trib'Art Association
 Unison – Croatian Music Alliance
 Asociatia MuseArt

Board of the European Music Council
The Board of the European Music Council consists of seven members and they are elected every two years at the EMC's Annual Meeting.

The seven current board members, elected at the EMC's online Annual Meeting in June 2021 are:
 Victoria Liedbergius (NO), President, nominated by the European Choral Association - Europa Cantat, Administrative Director of Ung i Kor
 Audrey Guerre (FR), Vice President, nominated by Live DMA, Coordinator at Live DMA
 Willem van Moort (NL), Treasurer, nominated by the European Music School Union, Director of BplusC
 Joanna Grotkowska (PL), nominated by the Polish Music Council, Music critic, journalist and radio producer
 Michalis Karakatsanis (CYP), nominated by the International Association of Music Information Centres, Administrator of the Cyprus Music Information Centre
 Harrie van den Elsen (NL), nominated by the European Association of Conservatoires (AEC), Dean Prince Claus Conservatoire Hanze University of Applied Sciences
 David Zsoldos (HU), nominated by the Hungarian Music Council, President of JM Hungary

Annual Meetings
The European Music Council hosts an annual meeting to discuss the work of the council. From 2010, the Annual Meeting was combined with a new European Forum on Music, based on the model set by the International Music Council's World Forum on Music.

Projects and other Events

European Forum for Music Education and Training (EFMET)
The European Forum for Music Education and Training (EFMET), was formed in 2003 with the aim of bringing organisations that deal with formal and non-formal music education together. It ways supported by the European Commission through its Culture programme. It aimed to improve the collaboration and communication between the facilitators on formal and non-formal music education, map current trends, and formulate recommendations for future use.

ExTra! Exchange Traditions
The aim of the ExTra! project was to stimulate the exchange of different musical traditions in Europe. Its main focus was on the integration of the musical traditions of immigrants and cultural minorities together with those already existing in Europe.

The European Music Council, as coordinator, usually collaborates with some of its member organisations, as well as other interested parties, for projects. In ExTra!, they were:

 Fondazione Adkins Chiti: Donne in Musica, Italy
 Cité de la musique
 Association Nationale Cultures et Traditions (ANCT), France
 International Yehudi Menuhin Foundation (IYMF), Belgium
 Music Information Centre Austria (mica)
 En Chordais, Greece

Music on Troubled Soils
Music on Troubled Soils was a conference held in Jerusalem in 2008 which discussed the role of music in troubled regions such as Israel, Cyprus and South Africa.

Speakers included: Marco Abbondanza, founder and director of 7 Sois 7 luas International Festival; Alenka Barber-Kersovan, lecturer at the Institute for Musicology of the University of Hamburg; Nenad Bogdanovic is a Serbian born Cypriot musician, organizer and youth-cultural worker; Veronika Cohen,  Chairperson of the Department of Music Education at the Jerusalem Academy of Music and Dance; Danny Felsteiner, director of the Silwan Music School in East Jerusalem; Marion Haak; Rahib Haddad, conductor; Laura Hassler, director of Musicians without Borders; Timo Klemettinen, Secretary General of the Finnish Music Council and Chairman of the EMC Board; Dubi Lenz, artistic director in Israel; Melisse Lewine-Boskovich, founder of the Arab-Jewish Adamai Ensemble; Myrna Lewis; Dochy Lichtensztajn, musicologist; Eva de Mayo, conductor and music teacher; Henrik Melius, founder of Spiritus Mundi; David Sanders, director of the National Music Council of the United States; Edwin Seroussi, Professor of Musicology and Director of the Jewish Music Research Center of the Hebrew University of Jerusalem; Maya Shavit, founder of the Efroni girls' choir; Hania Souda Sabbara, director of the Magnificat Institute; Wouter Turkenburg, the founder of the International Association of Schools of Jazz; Merlijn Twaalfhoven, composer; Frans Wolfkamp, managing director of Music in ME.

European Agenda for Music
 Vision
The European Agenda for Music aims to converge the European music sector’s many voices in order to establish an ongoing dialogue between policy makers and music sector stakeholders and was successfully launched on 21 March 2018.

 Approach
The European Agenda for Music contributes to a musically thriving Europe by setting out priorities for the music sector in Europe for the years to come. The European Agenda for Music took into account the specific advocacy papers the EMC formulated in 2010 and 2011, which are the “Manifesto for Youth and Music in Europe” and the “Bonn Declaration” that gives recommendation for the music education sector in Europe and for national and European legislation.

STAMP - Shared Training Activities for Music Professionals
STAMP responds to a need voiced by professionals in the music sector for greater professional training and the related process of lifelong learning and will aim at:

 Developing exemplary tools for vocational training (workshop models, guidelines for mentors and trainers), made available in an online platform. 
 Improving employability and entrepreneurship within the music sector in Central, Eastern and South Eastern Europe.

SHIFT - Shared Initiatives for Training
The project SHIFT will provide training initiatives for cultural leaders, working together and creating paths to face such global challenges. The partners will produce online manuals and guidelines during these two next years (December 2019-December 2021) on the following themes:

 Cultural Leadership.
 Climate Change.
 Inclusion.
 Gender & Power-relations.

References

External links
 European Music Council
 International Music Council
 STAMP
 European Agenda for Music
 SHIFT - Shared Initiatives for Training

Pan-European music organizations
Music organizations based in Europe
Organisations based in Bonn
1972 establishments in Europe
Music organisations based in Germany